Grand Mughal or Mogul, also Great Mughal, is a title coined by Europeans for the ruler of the Mughal Empire of India. The Mughals themselves used the title Padishah. The title is especially associated with the third in the line, Akbar the Great (1542–1605). It is said that the Portuguese called Akbar the Grand Mughal and sent Jesuit missionaries to convert him to Catholicism.  (In the same way, the Ottoman sultan was known as the "Grand Turk".)

The Mughal empire was romanticized in Europe, particularly from the sixteenth century onward. The empire's court at Agra, for instance, was often described in glowing terms. An account stated that it was not uncommon for Britons living in India to adopt the Mughal culture. 

Mughal rule persisted until the mid-nineteenth century, ending in 1857. After the Indian Rebellion of 1857, Bahadur Shah Zafar, the last Mughal emperor, was exiled by the British to Myanmar, where he spent the rest of his life in prison.

References

Heads of state
Royal titles
Mughal emperors